Enosuchus is an extinct genus of seymouriamorphs from Russia during the Middle Permian.

Reptiliomorphs
Paleozoic tetrapods of Asia